Himantolophus borealis is a species of footballfish, a type of anglerfish. The fish is bathypelagic and can be found at depths below . It is endemic to the northwest Pacific Ocean.

References

Himantolophidae
Deep sea fish
Fish described in 1984